Vinnitskaya is a feminine East Slavic surname. Notable people with the surname include:

Alena Vinnitskaya (born 1974), Ukrainian singer
Alena Vinnitskaya (born 1973), Belarusian long-distance runner
Anna Vinnitskaya (born 1983), Russian pianist

Surnames of Slavic origin